Der jüdische Arbeiter (The Jewish Worker) was a Labour Zionist newspaper published from Vienna 1927–1934. It was the organ of the Poale Zion organization in Austria. It substituted the Poale Zion publication Unsere Tribüne (published 1924–1926). It was initially published once every two weeks, but became a weekly in 1933. Julius Mamber was the editor of Der jüdische Arbeiter.

References

External links
Der jüdische Arbeiter archive

1927 establishments in Austria
1934 disestablishments in Austria
Biweekly newspapers
Defunct newspapers published in Austria
Defunct weekly newspapers
German-language newspapers published in Austria
Jews and Judaism in Vienna
Newspapers published in Vienna
Publications established in 1927
Publications disestablished in 1934
Weekly newspapers published in Austria